Celtencrinurus is a genus of trilobites in the order Phacopida that existed during the upper Ordovician in what is now Northern Ireland. It was described by Evitt and Tripp in 1977, and the type species is Celtencrinurus multisegmentatus, which was originally described under the genus Amphion by Portlock in 1843. It was described from the Killey Bridge Formation.

References

External links
 Celtencrinurus at the Paleobiology Database

Ordovician trilobites of Europe
Phacopida genera
Fossil taxa described in 1977
Fossils of Ireland
Paleozoic life of Quebec